Northeast Alabama Regional Airport  is five miles southwest of Gadsden, in Etowah County, Alabama. It is owned by Gadsden Airport Authority and it used to be Gadsden Municipal Airport.  The FAA's National Plan of Integrated Airport Systems for 2009–2013 categorized as a general aviation facility.

Facilities
It has two asphalt runways: 6/24 is 6,802 by 150 feet (2,073 x 46 m) and 18/36 is 4,806 by 150 feet (1,465 x 46 m).

In the year ending July 31, 2019 the airport had 23,886 aircraft operations, average 65 per day: 93% general aviation, 5% air taxi and 2% military. 40 aircraft were then based at this airport: 70% single-engine, 15% multi-engine, 8% jet, 5% glider and 2% helicopter.

Former airlines 
 Air New Orleans - mid-1980s
 Atlantic Southeast Airlines - early 1990s
 Southern Airways
The first airline flights were Southern Airways DC-3s in 1949; successor Republic pulled out its Convair 580s in 1981.

Incidents and accidents 
 On April 9, 1990, a Delta Connection flight operated by Atlantic Southeast Airlines  Embraer EMB-120 (Registration N217AS) as Flight 2254, en route to William B. Hartsfield Atlanta International Airport struck a Cessna 172 just after take-off. The Embraer was able to land, but the Cessna was unable to regain control and crashed. Of the seven on the Embraer, there were zero fatalities; the two on board the Cessna were killed. The cause of the crash was attributed to pilots of both aircraft inadequately performing a visual lookout in addition to restricted vision caused by the sun's glare.

References

External links 
 Airfield photos for GAD from Civil Air Patrol
 

Airports in Alabama
Transportation buildings and structures in Etowah County, Alabama
Former Essential Air Service airports